Built to Last is the tenth studio album by power metal band HammerFall, released on 4 November 2016. It is the first album to feature David Wallin on drums.

Track listing

Personnel
Joacim Cans – vocals
Oscar Dronjak – guitars
Pontus Norgren – guitars
Fredrik Larsson – bass
David Wallin – drums

Charts

References

External links
 Official HammerFall website

2016 albums
HammerFall albums
Napalm Records albums